Bluegrass Rules! is an album by Ricky Skaggs and Kentucky Thunder, released through Rounder Records on October 21, 1997. In 1999, the album won the group the Grammy Award for Best Bluegrass Album.

Track listing 
 "J.D.'s Words of Wisdom" – 0:05
 "Get Up John" (Bill Monroe) – 4:06
 "I Hope You've Learned" (Bill Carrigan, Eugene Butler) 2:20
 "Think of What You've Done" (Carter Stanley) – 2:37
 "Another Night" (Jack Adkins) – 3:57
 "The Drunken Driver" (Paul Westmoreland) – 3:10
 "Little Maggie" (Ralph Stanley) – 2:20
 "Amanda Jewell" (Ricky Skaggs) – 2:51
 "If I Lose" (Ralph Stanley) – 2:09
 "Ridin' That Midnight Train" (Ralph Stanley) – 2:20
 "Rank Stranger" (Albert E. Brumley) – 3:03
 "Somehow Tonight" (Earl Scruggs) – 2:51
 "Rawhide" (Bill Monroe) – 2:59
 "Well Glory" – 0:12

Personnel 

 Paul Brewster – Guitar, Guitar (Rhythm), Vocals
 Kent Bruce – Assistant Engineer
 Don Cobb – Mastering
 Craig Crutchfield – Design
 Tom Davis – Engineer
 Jerry Douglas – Dobro
 Stuart Duncan – Fiddle
 Mark Fain – Bass
 Carlos Grier – Mastering
 Bobby Hicks – Fiddle
 Kentucky Thunder – Group
 Graham Lewis – Assistant Engineer
 Jim McGuire – Photography

 Alan Messer – Photography
 Dennis Parker – Guitar, Guitar (Rhythm), Vocals
 Marc Pruett – Banjo
 Denny Purcell – Mastering
 Jonathan Russell – Mastering
 Al Schulman – Engineer
 Ricky Skaggs – Guitar, Mandolin, Guitar (Rhythm), Vocals, Producer, Photography
 Jason Stelluto – Assistant Engineer
 Chris Stone – Assistant Engineer
 Bryan Sutton – Guitar, Guitar (Rhythm)
 King Williams – Assistant Engineer

Chart performance

References

External links 
 Ricky Skaggs' official site

1997 albums
Ricky Skaggs albums
Rounder Records albums
Grammy Award for Best Bluegrass Album